Gaël Suter (born 23 March 1992) is a Swiss professional racing cyclist. He rode at the 2015 UCI Track Cycling World Championships. He won the gold medal in the scratch race at the 2016 UEC European Track Championships.

References

External links

1992 births
Living people
Swiss male cyclists
Place of birth missing (living people)
Olympic cyclists of Switzerland
Cyclists at the 2016 Summer Olympics